Aleksander Ułan (1670 – 1738) was a Lithuanian Tatar officer, who served as part of the Royal Saxon Army. It has been suggested that the name Uhlan derives from his surname.

Early life 
He was from Ašmena district.

Military career 
During the Polish Civil War, Aleksander Ułan sided with King Augustus II the Strong. As a reward for his loyalty, Ułan was given the Koszoły village in 1711. In 1713, rotmistrz Ułan was promoted to Colonel and given command of a Lithuanian Tatar regiment. In 1715-1716, he and his regiment fought on King Augustus II's side against the Tarnogród confederates.

Service in Saxon army 
In 1717 the regiment was transferred to Saxon pay. The regiment's nominal commander was General . The regiment was composed of eight banners, totaling around 400 soldiers.

In 1734, Aleksander Ułan commanded the 4th Lithuanian Vanguard Regiment.

Citations

References 
 

Grand Duchy of Lithuania
Lithuanian Army officers
Military personnel of Saxony
Polish soldiers
Tatar culture
1670 births
1738 deaths